Aleš Řebíček (born 14 April 1967, in Kladno) is a Czech politician. In 2006 he was elected a member of the Chamber of Deputies and from September 2006 to January 2009 he was the Minister of Transport.

Řebíček is a graduate of the University of Transport and Communications in Žilina. He's married and has three sons.

From 2011 to 2015 he was a major stockholder of the football club SK Slavia Prague and its chairman.

References

External links 
 Aleš Řebíček: Své bývalé firmě jsem jako ministr nepomáhal (Hospodářské noviny) 

1967 births
Living people
Transport ministers of the Czech Republic
Members of the Chamber of Deputies of the Czech Republic (2006–2010)
Politicians from Kladno
Civic Democratic Party (Czech Republic) MPs
Civic Democratic Party (Czech Republic) Government ministers
Czech football chairmen and investors
SK Slavia Prague non-playing staff